Inner Vision may refer to:

inner vision
Innervisions Stevie Wonder album
"Inner Vision", Multiplicity (album)
Inner Vision, EP by Jun Toba
"Innervision", song by System of a Down